The name Wordfast is used for any number of translation memory products developed by Wordfast LLC. The original Wordfast product, now called Wordfast Classic, was developed by Yves Champollion in 1999 as a cheaper alternative to Trados, a well-known translation memory program.  The current Wordfast products run on a variety of platforms, but use largely compatible translation memory formats, and often also have similar workflows.  The software is most popular with freelance translators, although some of the products are also suited for corporate environments.

Wordfast LLC is based in Delaware, United States, although most of the development takes place in Paris, France.  Apart from these two locations, there is also a support center in the Czech Republic. The company has around 50 employees.

History 
Development on Wordfast version 1 (then called simply Wordfast) was begun in 1999 in Paris, France, by Yves Champollion.  It was made up of a set of macros that ran inside of Microsoft Word, version 97 or higher.  At that time, other translation memory programs also worked inside Microsoft Word, for example Trados.

Until late 2002, this MS Word-based tool (now known as Wordfast Classic) was freeware. Through word of mouth, Wordfast grew to become the second most widely used TM software among translators.

In 2006, the company Wordfast LLC was founded by Philip Shawe and Elizabeth Elting, also co-owners of the translation company TransPerfect. In July 2006, Mr. Champollion sold all interest in the Wordfast Server computer program to Wordfast LLC.  Since that time, Wordfast has been the sole owner of all right, title and interest, including the copyright, in the Wordfast Server Code. Since then, Champollion, while holding the title Founder and Chief Architect, has also been CEO and president of the company Wordfast LLC.

In January 2009, Wordfast released Wordfast Pro, a standalone Java-based TM tool.

In May 2010, Wordfast released a free online tool known as Wordfast Anywhere. This tool allows translators to work on projects from virtually any web-enabled device including smartphones, PDAs and tablets.  By July 2010, 5000 users had registered at Wordfast Anywhere, and by November 2010 the number was 10,000.

In April 2016, Wordfast released Wordfast Pro 4, a major upgrade to their standalone Java-based TM tool. This tool includes advanced translation management features including a WYSIWYG editor, the ability to create multilingual translation packages, real-time quality assurance, and a powerful translation editor filter.  An update to Wordfast Pro 4 called "Wordfast Pro 5" was released in April 2017, with mostly under-the-hood performance improvements.

Products

Wordfast Classic (WFC) 
Wordfast Classic (WFC) is written in Visual Basic, and runs inside Microsoft Word. It supports Microsoft Word 97 or higher on any platform, although some features present in recent versions of WFC only work on higher versions of Microsoft Word.

When a document is translated using WFC, it is temporarily turned into a bilingual document by adding segment delimiting characters and retaining both source and target text within the same file. Afterwards, the source text and segment delimiters are removed from the file in a process called "cleaning up".  For this reason, the bilingual file format is often referred to as an "uncleaned file".  This workflow is similar to that of Trados 5, WordFisher, Logoport and Metatexis.

WFC can handle the following formats: any format that Microsoft Word can read, including plain text files, Word documents (DOC/DOCX), Rich Text Format (RTF), tagged RTF and tagged XML.  Earlier versions of WFC could translate Microsoft Excel (XLS/XLSX) and PowerPoint (PPT/PPTX) files directly, but this feature is not present in the most recent version.  Users of the current version of WFC who need to translate Excel and PowerPoint files need to use a demo copy of Wordfast Pro 3 or 5 to create an intermediary file format.  WFC does not offer direct support for OpenDocument formats because the current versions of Microsoft Word do not have import filters for OpenDocument files.

WFC is actively developed, with regular updates, and the most recent major version number is 8.

History 

The first version of Wordfast Classic was called Wordfast version 1, and was developed by Yves Champollion. It was distributed to the public in 1999.

Version 2 was used by the translation agency Linguex, which acquired a 9-month exclusive usage right for their in-house staff and affiliated freelancers in late 1999. During this time Wordfast was expanded with features such as rule-based and glossary quality control, and network support. After the demise of Linguex, version 3 of Wordfast was released to the public, as a free tool with mandatory registration.

In mid-2001 the developers of Wordfast signed a joint-venture agreement with the translation group Logos for distribution of the program, under a newly created UK company called Champollion Wordfast Ltd. The joint-venture ceased in August of that year after Logos had failed to share their software source code with the Wordfast developer, despite having gained access to Wordfast's source code through intercepting the developers' e-mails. For a number of years after the joint-venture ended, Logos continued to distribute an older version of Wordfast from their web site, www.wordfast.org, and claimed that the right to the name "Wordfast" or distributing newer versions of it was owned by them.

Initially, version 3 was freeware, with mandatory registration, using a serial number generated by the user's computer.  In October 2002, Wordfast became a commercial product with three-year licenses at a price of EUR 170 for users from wealthy countries and EUR 50 (later EUR 85) for users from other countries.

Wordfast Anywhere (WFA) 
Wordfast Anywhere (WFA) is a free browser-based version of Wordfast, with a workflow and user interface similar to that of Wordfast Classic.  Although the service is free, certain restrictions apply, most notably an upload limit of 2 MB (although files can be zipped) and a limit of 10 documents simultaneously worked on.

WFA's privacy policy is that all uploaded documents remain confidential and are not shared.  Users can optionally use machine translation and access a large read-only public translation memory.

In addition to being usable on tablets such as Windows Mobile, Android and Palm OS, WFA is also available as an iPhone app. WFA has built-in optical character recognition of PDF files.

WFA can handle Word documents (DOC/DOCX), Microsoft Excel (XLS/XLSX), PowerPoint (PPT/PPTX), Rich Text Format (RTF), Text (TXT), HTML, InDesign(INX), FrameMaker (MIF), TIFF (TIF/TIFF) and both editable and OCR-able PDF. It does not offer support for OpenDocument formats.  Although translation is done within the browser environment, users can also download unfinished translations in Wordfast Pro 5's TXLF bilingual format as well as in a bilingual review format that can be handled by many other modern CAT tools.

Users of Wordfast Classic and Wordfast Pro 3 and 5 can connect to translation memories and glossaries stored on Wordfast Anywhere directly from within their respective programs.

History 
Wordfast Anywhere was released in May 2010, although development versions were available to the public as early as May 2009. Before the product was first released, it was not certain whether it would remain a free service after release.

OCR capability for PDF files was added to Wordfast Anywhere in April 2011.  Wordfast Anywhere became available as an iPhone app in 2012.

Wordfast Pro 3 (WFP3) 
Wordfast Pro 3 (WFP3) is a stand-alone, multiplatform (Windows, Mac, Linux) translation memory tool with much similar features as Wordfast Classic and other major CAT tools.  WFP3 uses a bilingual intermediary format called TXML, which is a simple XML format.  WFP3 extracts all translatable content from source files and stores it in a TXML file, which is translated in WFP3.  When the translation is finished, WFP3 merges the TXML file with the original source file to create a translated target file.

WFP3 can export unfinished translations to a bilingual review file, which is a Microsoft Word DOC file, and import updated content from the same format again.

WFP3 can handle Word documents (DOC/DOCX), Excel (XLS/XLSX), PowerPoint (PPT/PPTX), Visio (VSD/VDX/VSDX), Portable Object files (PO), Rich Text Format (RTF), Text (TXT), HTML (HTML/HTM), XML, ASP, JSP, Java, InDesign (INX/IDML), InCopy (INC), FrameMaker (MIF), Quark (TAG), Xliff (XLF/XLIFF), SDL Trados (SDLXLIFF/TTX) and editable PDF. It does not offer support for OpenDocument formats.

WFP3 uses the same translation memory and glossary format as Wordfast Classic.  WFP3 and WFP5 can be installed on the same computer.

History  
The program that is currently referred to as "Wordfast Pro 3" was initially called "Wordfast Pro 6.0", because the latest version of Wordfast Classic at that time was version 5.  However, after Wordfast Classic progressed to version number 6 itself, Wordfast Pro's version numbering was restarted.

A pre-release trial version was available from late 2008, and the first release version was in January 2009.  Version 2 was released by mid-2009, and version 3 became available by early 2012.  The current major version, 3.4, was released on 15 Apr 2014.  WFP3 is still available from the Wordfast web site, and a license for "Wordfast Pro 5" includes a separate license for WFP3, but development on this product has stopped.

Wordfast Pro 5 (WFP5) 
Wordfast Pro 5 (WFP5) is a stand-alone, multiplatform (Windows, Mac, Linux) translation memory tool with much similar features as other major CAT tools.  WFP5 uses a bilingual intermediary format called TXLF, which is a fully compliant XLIFF variant.  WFP5 extracts all translatable content from source files and stores it in a TXLF file, which is translated in WFP5.  When the translation is finished, WFP5 merges the TXLF file with the original source file to create a translated target file.

WFP5 can handle Word documents (DOC/DOCX), Excel (XLS/XLSX), PowerPoint (PPT/PPTX), Visio (VSD/VDX/VSDX), Portable Object files (PO), Rich Text Format (RTF), Text (TXT), HTML (HTML/HTM), XML, ASP, JSP, Java, JSON, Framemaker, InDesign (INX/IDML), InCopy (INC), FrameMaker (MIF), Quark (TAG), Xliff (XLF/XLIFF), TXLF, and SDL Trados (SDLXLIFF/TTX). It does not offer support for OpenDocument formats.

WFP5 offers pseudo WYSIWIG capability.  Its translation memory and glossary formats are not compatible with that of Wordfast Pro 3 and Wordfast Classic.  WFP5 lacks some features that are present in Wordfast Pro 3, but also has many features that are not present in Wordfast Pro 3.

History 
In December 2013, the Wordfast company released a beta version of a completely redesigned version of Wordast Pro, version 4, and announced that the new version will be released early in 2014. In the end, Wordfast Pro 4 was only released in mid 2015. Version 5 was released in April 2017.

PlusTools 
This is a set of free tools that run inside Microsoft Word, designed to help Wordfast Classic translators perform specific advanced functions such as text extraction and alignment.

VLTM Project (Very Large Translation Memory) 
Users can leverage content from a very large public TM, or set up a private workgroup where they can share TMs among translators they are collaborating with.

Wordfast Server (WFS) 
Wordfast Server (WFS) is a secure TM server application that works in combination with either Wordfast Classic, Wordfast Pro, or Wordfast Anywhere to enable real-time TM sharing among translators located anywhere in the world.

WFS supports Translation memories in TMX or Wordfast TM (txt) format, leverages up to 1,000 TMs containing 1 billion TUs each and serves up to 50,000 users simultaneously.

WFS can be used indefinitely and for free in demo mode for up to 2 concurrent users. Users of other translation tools, namely MemoQ and SDL Trados, can also connect to WFS linguistic assets.

Supported translation memory and glossary formats 
The original Wordfast translation memory format was a simple tab-delimited text file that can be opened and edited in a text editor. Wordfast products can also import and export TMX files for memory exchange with other major commercial CAT tools. Wordfast's original glossary format was a simple tab-delimited text file. These formats are still used today by Wordfast Anywhere, Wordfast Classic, Wordfast Server, and Wordfast Pro 3 (TM only, not the glossary). Wordfast Pro 5 uses a database format for the TM and glossary. The transition to a database format was made to increase the TM and glossary size limitations (e.g. from 1 million to 5 million translation units) as well as improve concordance search speeds.

Wordfast products can also import TBX files for terminology exchange with other major commercial CAT tools.

Wordfast products can support multiple TMs and glossaries.  Text-based TMs can store up to 1 million TUs and glossaries can store up to 250,000 entries each. Wordfast Pro 5 TMs can store up to 5 million TUs and glossaries over 1 million entries each.

Wordfast is able to use server-based TMs, and retrieve data from machine translation tools (including Google Translate and Microsoft Translator).

Documentation and support 
Comprehensive user manuals can be downloaded from the Wordfast web site.  Wordfast Pro and Wordfast Anywhere also offer online help pages.  Users can access the Wordfast wiki for help getting started, tips and tricks, FAQs, etc. Video tutorials are available on Wordfast's dedicated YouTube page.

Wordfast offers users free technical support with the purchase of a license. Users can also access free peer support forums available in dozens of languages.

Pricing and licensing 
WFC and WFP can be purchased individually for 400 euros per license or together as a suite for 500 euros per license. Special discounts are available for users in certain countries. Bulk discounts also apply for the purchase of 3 or more licenses.  All Wordfast licenses include, from date of purchase: 
free email support; 
free upgrades to new releases of the software for three years;  
the right to relicense the software to keep it running for three years.

After the 3-year license period, users can renew their license for another 3 years for 50% of the standard list price of a license at the time of renewal.

Copyright Matter

According to an October 2017 court filing in New York State Supreme Court, after the sale of Wordfast to Wordfast LLC, Wordfast allowed the Wordfast Server Code, together with the Wordfast trademark, to be used by TransPerfect translation company, pursuant to a non-exclusive license. The lawsuit challenges a custodian appointed by a Delaware judge to sell TransPerfect, accusing him of Copyright Infringement, or pirating the code, to enhance the valuation of the firm.

See also 
 Computer-assisted translation

References

External links 
 Official Wordfast Site (High-bandwidth)
 Official Wordfast Site (Low-bandwidth)
 Wordfast Anywhere Site
 Yves Champollion

User groups 
 Wordfast Classic Yahoogroup
 Wordfast Pro Yahoogroup
 Wordfast Anywhere Yahoogroup

Translation software
Computer-assisted translation software programmed in Java